Sander L. van der Linden is a social psychologist, author, and professor of social psychology in society in the department of psychology at the University of Cambridge, England where he has directed the Cambridge Social Decision-Making Laboratory since 2016. He is also a fellow at Churchill College, Cambridge, a research affiliate of the Yale Program on Climate Change Communication at Yale University and the Winton Centre for Risk and Evidence Communication at the University of Cambridge.

Van der Linden studies the psychology of social influence, risk, human judgment, and decision-making.

He was named a Rising Star by the Association for Psychological Science and is particularly known for his research on the psychology of social issues, such as fake news, COVID-19, and climate change. He is recognized as an authority on understanding and dealing with misinformation.

In 2021, he was designated an ISI Highly Cited Researcher.

Research Contributions

A Psychological Vaccine Against Misinformation 

Van der Linden is most well-known and widely credited for his research program that looks at how to protect people from fake news and misinformation. The research draws on inoculation theory where, following the biomedical analogy, forewarning people and exposing them to a severely weakened dose of fake news can generate psychological resistance against it.

He is known for co-developing the popular fake news game Bad News (video game), which simulates a social media feed and teaches people about the manipulation techniques used in the production of fake news. A more recent version of the game called "GoViral!" aims to inoculate against misinformation about COVID-19 specifically and is listed as a resource by the World Health Organization.

Gateway Belief Model 
Van der Linden is known for the Gateway belief model (GBM), a dual-process theory of reasoning. The model postulates a two-step process of attitude change. In the first step, perceptions of agreement among a group of influential referents (e.g. experts) influence key private attitudes that people may hold about an issue (e.g., that global warming is human-caused). In turn, these central cognitive and affective beliefs are hypothesized to shape public attitudes and support for science.

In other words, the model suggests that what underpins people's attitudes toward (often contested) science is their perception of a scientific consensus. Correcting people's (mis)perception of scientific agreement on an issue is therefore regarded as a "gateway" cognition to eliciting subsequent changes in related beliefs that people hold about contested social and scientific issues.

With the consensus heuristic as the primary mechanism for initiating the attitude change, the model finds its theoretical roots in other prominent social psychological theories such as the heuristic-systematic model and the Elaboration Likelihood Model. The model has been applied in a variety of contexts, including climate change, vaccination, the Brexit debate, and GMOs. One analysis from Skeptical Science of 37 published papers notes that about 86% of them support the broad tenets of the GBM.

Conspiracy theories
Van der Linden and others have surveyed more than 5,000 Americans online about their political preferences, asking them to respond to questions developed to measure conspiratorial thinking and paranoia.  They found that those at extremes of the political spectrum were more conspiratorial than those in the middle. Researchers also found that conservatives were more prone to conspiracy thinking than liberals. Van der Linden speculates that this may reflect strong identification with conservative groups and values, and attempts to manage uncertainty.

Education 
Van der Linden completed a postdoctoral fellowship in the department of psychology and the Woodrow Wilson School of Public Affairs at Princeton University and was a visiting research scholar (2012-2014) at Yale University. He received his Ph.D. from the London School of Economics and Political Science in 2014 with a thesis titled The social-psychological determinants of climate change risk perceptions, intentions and behaviours: a national study, and earned his undergraduate degree from the University of Amsterdam and California State University, Chico.

Career
He serves on the editorial board of Psychology, Public Policy, and Law, Personality and Individual Differences, Current Research in Social and Ecological Psychology, and the Journal of Risk Research, among other professional publications.

He was the editor-in-chief of the Journal of Environmental Psychology from 2018 to 2021.

Bibliography

Books

 FOOLPROOF: Why We Fall for Misinformation and How to Build Immunity (HarperCollins), 2023. 
 Risk and Uncertainty in a Post-Truth Society (Earthscan Risk in Society), 2019.

References

External links
 Cambridge Social Decision-Making Lab

Living people
Dutch social psychologists
Dutch psychologists
Fellows of Churchill College, Cambridge
Year of birth missing (living people)